Charles Cochran (31 August 1800 – 9 September 1885) was an English first-class cricketer associated with Surrey and Epsom Cricket Club who was active in the 1810s. He is recorded in one match in 1819, totalling 7 runs with a highest score of 6.

References

English cricketers
English cricketers of 1787 to 1825
1800 births
1885 deaths
Epsom cricketers
Cricketers from Mumbai